The following is a list of the TVB Star Awards Malaysia winners and nominees for My Favourite TVB Actor and Actress in a Supporting Role. The award was first introduced in 2007 at the 2006 Astro Wah Lai Toi Drama Awards as My Favourite Supporting Character. The award was separated into Supporting Actor and Actress in 2010. The ceremony was renamed TVB Star Awards Malaysia in 2013.

Winners and nominees

2000s

2010s

References

TVB Star Award for Favourite Supporting Performances